Henry Richard DeWitt (July 12, 1875 - September 23, 1936) was a New York lawyer and politician. A member of the Republican Party, he served in the New York State Assembly from 1914 to 1916.

Early life

Henry Richard DeWitt was born in Spring Valley, New York on July 12, 1875, the son of Richard DeWitt and Katharine Hammond. His father was a Dutch Reformed minister who served a number of congregations in New York until his death in 1901. Henry R. DeWitt's great-great grandfather was the statesman Charles DeWitt, and his great-uncle was the congressman and diplomat Charles G. DeWitt. Through his father's side of the family, DeWitt was also a member of the Ten Eyck family and a relative of Simeon DeWitt and DeWitt Clinton. Henry R. DeWitt graduated from Rutgers University in 1898 and Albany Law School in 1900.

Career

DeWitt practiced law and served as the Deputy County Clerk in Ulster County, New York before running for elected office. Running as a member of the Republican Party, DeWitt was elected to the New York State Assembly for Ulster County's first district, defeating his Democratic Party opponent 4,937 votes to 4,680 votes. DeWitt was subsequently re-elected twice, serving in the assembly from 1914 to 1916. While an assemblyman, DeWitt was a member of the General Laws, Codes, Military Affairs, and Villages committees. After leaving office, DeWitt acted as the clerk for Ulster County's board of supervisors until 1921.

Personal life
DeWitt married Charlotte Anderson Folant on October 16, 1907. They had one daughter, Natalie Sims DeWitt, who married Richard E. Luff.

Henry Richard DeWitt died in Wakefield, Massachusetts on September 23, 1936.

His father Richard (1839-1901) was the son of TenEyck DeWitt (1792-1883) and Antje "Ann" Crispell DeWitt (1796-1860). He had at least three siblings:
 Elmore DeWitt (1865-1933), born at Guilford, just outside of Gardiner, New York
 Mary DeWitt (1870-1965), born at Guilford
 Anna Crispell DeWitt (1872-1914), born at Spring Valley; married William S. Eltinge (1874-1931), her 2nd cousin once removed through the Crispell family

Henry descends, aside from the DeWitt family, from many of the early Dutch settler families to Ulster County, New York, including the Brodhead, DuBois, Blanchan, Ten Eyck, Elmendorf, Kiersted, Wynkoop, Ten Broeck, Crispell, Newkirk, Roosa, Krom, Van Vliet, Hasbrouck, Deyo, Schoonmaker and Louw families. Some notable ancestors include Louis DuBois (Huguenot), one of the thirteen patentees or founders of New Paltz, New York; Claes Martenszen Roosevelt, ancestor of United States Presidents Theodore Roosevelt and Franklin D. Roosevelt; Antoine Crispell, another New Paltz patentee; Abraham Hasbrouck, another New Paltz patentee; and Christian Deyo, another New Paltz patentee.

References 

1875 births
1936 deaths
People from Spring Valley, New York
20th-century American lawyers
20th-century American politicians
People from Kingston, New York
De Witt family